Air cooled clothing is a term for clothing that actively cools down the wearer.  It has primarily been used by workers in areas where air conditioning systems cannot be easily installed, such as tunnels and underground construction sites. Air-cooled clothing on the market does not operate by actually cooling down the air, as a room AC unit does. Instead, it increases the natural body cooling of the wearer by blowing air and sometimes water vapor around the body, decreasing skin temperature by the evaporation of sweat and vapor.

History
Patents for air cooled clothing have been around for years, but few products have actually made it to market. Hiroshi Ichigawa, a former Sony engineer spent 6 years to develop Kuchofuku, or "air-conditioned clothing" and launched his company in 2004 to manufacture and sell it. He first developed the water cooling system, but changed it to the air cooling system later because it was too uncomfortable to feel wet cloth. Another company that brought air conditioned shirts to market is Octocool, which is an online distributor of air cooled clothes. Attached to the clothing are two lightweight fans that help draw in air and help vaporize sweat.  The fans, attached to the back of the clothing near the waist, are about 10 cm wide and run on rechargeable lithium ion batteries that last between 8.5 and 59 hours depending on the speed of the fan.

Advantage
One advantage of air-cooled clothing is that it requires much less energy to cool people down than to cool down their entire environment. For instance, an air cooled shirt uses 4,400 mAh of power for 8.5 hours on the fastest fan setting, while an average central air conditioning unit uses 3000 to 5000 watts of power. In some cases, the purpose of air-conditioning is not to cool down the objects in the room, but the people.  Directly ventilating clothing is therefore far more efficient.  A 2012 New York Times article reported that gases commonly used in air conditioning absorb some 2,100 times more infrared radiation per ton than carbon dioxide, and due partly to increasing use of air conditioning in the developing world (particularly in tropical areas like India, Malaysia, Indonesia, Brazil, and southern China), air conditioning is projected to contribute to some 27% of the overall greenhouse gas emissions by 2050.  Although there are some ideas for room air conditioning units that do not significantly contribute to producing greenhouse gases, none of those options are yet on the market.

See also 
 Liquid cooling and ventilation garment

References

External links
NY Times: Air conditioning as a major contributor to climate change

Environmental suits